Adriana Porter (July 1857 – March 1, 1946) was an alleged witch. She was born in Nova Scotia, Canada, and died in  Melrose, Massachusetts, United States.

Porter's notability rests on a poem, The Rede of the Wiccae, which was published by her granddaughter Lady Gwen Thompson in Green Egg magazine in 1975 and attributed to her. It has become a semi-sacred text within the culture of Wicca.

Thompson claimed that she had inherited her Wiccan beliefs and practices from Porter, who had summarized them in the poem. If this were true, it would confirm that the hidden practices of witchcraft articulated by Gerald Gardner in his books existed in independent traditions, uninfluenced by his writings.

The true authorship of the poem is, however, disputed. Some evidence suggests that it dates from several decades after Porter's death.

Sources
 
 Bott, Adrian, "The Wiccan Rede", White Dragon magazine, Lughnasadh 2003

1857 births
1946 deaths
20th-century Canadian poets
20th-century Canadian women writers
Canadian emigrants to the United States
People from Melrose, Massachusetts
Canadian women poets
Writers from Nova Scotia